Sir William Maynard, 1st Baronet (6 October 1641 – 7 November 1685) was an English politician and baronet.

He was the third and eldest surviving son of Charles Maynard and his wife Mary Corsellis, daughter of Zeager Corsellis, of London. His uncle was William Maynard, 1st Baron Maynard. On 1 February 1681, Maynard was created a Baronet, of Walthamstow, in the County of Essex. In April 1685, he entered the English House of Commons as a Member of Parliament (MP) for Essex, but died seven months later.

He married Mary Baynbrigg, daughter of William Baynbrigg, and had four sons and three daughters from her. Maynard died in 1685 and was buried at his seat in Walthamstow. He was succeeded in the baronetcy successively by his sons, William II, 2nd Baronet and Henry, 3rd Baronet.

References

1641 births
1685 deaths
Baronets in the Baronetage of England
English MPs 1685–1687
History of the London Borough of Waltham Forest